Maynilad Water Services, Inc., better known as Maynilad, is the water and wastewater services provider of cities and municipalities that form the West Zone of the Greater Manila Area in the Philippines. It is an agent and contractor of the Metropolitan Waterworks and Sewerage System (MWSS). Maynilad is one of two private water providers in Metro Manila, the other being Manila Water.

Incorporated in 1997, Maynilad currently serves over 9 million people in the cities of Caloocan, Las Piñas, Malabon, Muntinlupa, Navotas, Parañaque, Pasay, and Valenzuela; along with most of the City of Manila and portions of Quezon City and Makati west of the Metro Manila Skyway. Outside of Metro Manila, in Cavite Province it serves the cities of Cavite, Bacoor and Imus and the municipalities of Kawit, Noveleta and Rosario.

History
As part of the water privatization in Metro Manila, the Metropolitan Waterworks and Sewerage System awarded contracts to two companies splitting Metro Manila into a west and east zones. Maynilad Water Services Inc. was formed in 1997 as a partnership of the Benpres Holdings Corporation (now the Lopez Group of Companies) and Ondeo Water Services Inc. after it won the bidding to run the water and wastewater services in the West Zone.

Benpres eventually left the partnership in 2006 to settle a US$240 million debt. Then January 24, 2007, a consortium led by Metro Pacific Investments Corporation and the DMCI Holdings, Inc. took over the company and able to pay the debt by January 2008.

Water Source

Angat Dam is the main source of water for Metro Manila. It supplies about 90 percent of raw water requirements for Metro Manila through the facilities of the Metropolitan Waterworks and Sewerage System. Maynilad is sourcing its more than 90 percent raw water supply requirement from Angat Dam.

Laguna de Bay is another source of water for Maynilad, mainly serving Muntinlupa and Cavite.

Service area

West Zone of Metro Manila 

 Manila (excluding the districts of Santa Ana, Manila and San Andres, Manila)
 Caloocan
 Las Piñas
 Malabon 
 Muntinlupa
 Navotas
 Pasay
 Parañaque
 Valenzuela
 Quezon City (North western part)
 Makati (West part)

Cavite (West Cavite & East Cavite Business Area) 
by February 1, 2021, Maynilad divided the Cavite Business Area into 2 sub-office.

East Cavite Business Area

Bacoor
Imus City (except for the Barangays of Carsadang Bago, Medicion, Toclong(Imus), Bayan Luma, Tanzang Luma, Pag-asa and Poblacion is part of West Cavite Business Area )

West Cavite Business Area
Cavite City
Kawit
Noveleta
Rosario
Imus City (Some parts of the city)

Impact

Access to Water 
By the end of 2018, Maynilad posted a total of 1,407,503 accounts or about 9.5 million people in its customer base. Almost all customers of Maynilad enjoy 24-hour uninterrupted water supply at an average pressure of seven pounds per square inch.

Water Losses 
When Maynilad was re-privatized in 2007, the company was losing some 1,500 million liters of treated water per day. This translated to a Non-Revenue Water (NRW) level of 67%—meaning two-thirds of the potable water it was producing was being lost.

Most of the water—some 75% —was lost through the old and inefficient distribution system Maynilad inherited from the government and its previous owners. In fact, the company’s pipe network is considered the oldest in Asia, some dating back to the time when the Philippines was still under the Spanish rule.

While a massive pipe replacement program would have dramatically reduced its NRW in a short amount of time, Maynilad decided against it because it would ultimately result in significantly higher tariffs for its customers. Instead, it invested in its human resources, technical equipment, engineering methodologies and internal procedures so it could serve more people through less water losses.

After launching what was dubbed as the “largest NRW management project in the world”, Maynilad has successfully brought down its NRW level to an all-time low of 27% by the end of 2018.

In 2017, Maynilad plugged a total of 26,792 pipe leaks within its concessionaire area thus bringing the company’s total leak repairs to 316,757 since its re-privatization in 2007.

Maynilad’s water loss reduction efforts have been recognized by various organizations including the International Water Association and the United Nations Human Settlements Programme (UN Habitat).

Wastewater Management 
Aside from water services, Maynilad also manages wastewater in the West Zone in the form of sewerage and sanitation services.

Sewerage services involve the treatment of wastewater conveyed via a sewer network to Maynilad’s sewage treatment plants. At present, only residents and establishments in Ayala Alabang Village in Muntinlupa, Magallanes Village in Makati, portions of Manila, Malabon, and Navotas, Project 7 and Project 8 in Quezon City, and portions of South Caloocan may connect to Maynilad’s sewerage system.

Meanwhile, Maynilad offers sanitation services or septic tank cleaning to households that are not yet connected to its sewer system. Septic tank cleaning or desludging comes at no extra cost for residential and semi-business account holders, and is conducted every five to seven years.

Ownership
 Metro Pacific Investments Corporation: 52.8%
 DMCI Holdings, Inc.: 25.24%
 Marubeni Corporation: 21.54%

See also
 Water supply and sanitation in the Philippines

References

External links

 

Water companies of the Philippines
Water supply and sanitation in Metro Manila
Companies based in Quezon City
1997 establishments in the Philippines